The 2017 Asian Women's Softball Championship was an international softball tournament which featured twelve nations and was held from 29 November–4 December 2017 in Taichung, Taiwan.

The top five teams qualified for the 2018 Asian Games while the top three teams qualified for the 2018 Women's Softball World Championship

Japan won the championship by winning 7–0 over the Philippines. With Japan already qualified as host, fourth placers, China qualified for the 2018 Women's Softball World Championship along with the Philippines and third-placers, Chinese Taipei.

Participants

Preliminary round

Group A

Group B

Final round

Final

Final standings

Source:World Baseball Softball Confederation

See also
 List of sporting events in Taiwan

External links

References

Asian Women's Softball Championship
International sports competitions hosted by Taiwan
2017 in Taiwanese women's sport